Michelle Ekizian (born November 21, 1956) is an American composer of Armenian heritage.

Life
Michelle Ekizian was born in Bronxville, New York. She graduated with a bachelor's degree from the Manhattan School of Music and a master's degree from Columbia University, having studied with Chou Wen-chung, Mario Davidovsky, Nicolas Flagello and Vladimir Ussachevsky. Her music has been performed internationally.

Honors and awards
 American Prix de Rome from the American Academy in Rome, 1988
 Commerce Bank International Composition Award, 1987
 Indiana State University/Louisville Orchestra New Music Competition Prize, 1990
 Aram Khachaturian Award
 ACA Recording Award
 John Simon Guggenheim Memorial Foundation fellowship
 National Endowment for the Arts fellowship

Works
Selected works include:
 Octoéchos for Double String Quartet and Soprano
 The Exiled Heart orchestral cycle, including The Exiled Heart (1986), Morning of Light (1988), and Beyond the Reach of Wind and Fire (1989)
 Symphony #1: When Light Divided
 Slow Apocolypse: Fanfare for Orchestra Manque, 1995
 A Saint Gregory Moment
 David of Sassoun, 1992
 Sabre Dances for orchestra, 1991
 Red Harvest: Concerto for violin and orchestra

Her music has been recorded and issued on CD, including:
 Works by Michelle Ekizian and Louis Karchin, New World Records
 American Academy in Rome spring concert, 1989 June 5

References

1956 births
Living people
20th-century classical composers
American women classical composers
American classical composers
People from Bronxville, New York
American people of Armenian descent
Manhattan School of Music alumni
Columbia University alumni
National Endowment for the Arts Fellows
20th-century American women musicians
20th-century American composers
20th-century women composers
21st-century American women